Krasny Gornyak is a rural locality (a settlement) in Gorkinskoye Rural Settlement, Kirzhachsky District, Vladimir Oblast, Russia. The population was 7 as of 2010. There are 6 streets.

Geography 
Krasny Gornyak is located 16 km north of Kirzhach (the district's administrative centre) by road. Gorka is the nearest rural locality.

References 

Rural localities in Kirzhachsky District